Jude (alternatively Judas or Judah) is one of the brothers of Jesus
() according to the New Testament. He is traditionally identified as the author of the Epistle of Jude, a short epistle which is reckoned among the seven general epistles of the New Testament—placed after Paul's epistles and before the Book of Revelation—and considered canonical by Christians. Catholics and Eastern Orthodox Christians believe this Jude is the same person as Jude the Apostle; Catholics hold that Jude was a cousin, but not literally a brother of Jesus, while the Eastern Orthodox hold that Jude is St. Joseph’s son from a previous marriage.

New Testament

Mark 6:3 and  Matthew 13:55 record the people of Nazareth saying of Jesus: "Is not this the carpenter, the son of Mary, the brother of James, and Joses, and of Judas, and Simon? and are not his sisters here with us?". Some Protestants, including R. V. Tasker and D. Hill, generally relate these brothers and sisters to the Matthew 1:25 indication that Joseph "did not know her till she had brought forth her firstborn Son" and the implication that Joseph and Mary had customary marital relations thereafter. But K. Beyer points out that Greek  ('until') after a negative "often has no implication at all about what happened after the limit of the 'until' was reached".

Many Christians (Roman Catholics, Eastern Orthodox, and some Protestants) believe that "brothers of Jesus" are not biological children of Mary, but step-brothers or cousins, which is part of the doctrine of perpetual virginity of Mary.

Attribution of Jude
The Epistle of Jude has been attributed to him, on the basis of the heading "Jude, the servant of Jesus Christ, and brother of James" where "brother of James" is taken as brother of James the brother of Jesus.

Clement of Alexandria who lived c. 150–215 AD wrote in his work "Comments on the Epistle of Jude" that Jude, the Epistle of Jude's author was a son of Joseph and a brother of the Lord (without specifying whether he is a son of Joseph by a previous marriage or of Joseph and Mary)

According to the surviving fragments of the work Exposition of the Sayings of the Lord of the Apostolic Father Papias of Hierapolis, who lived c. 70–163 AD, Mary the wife of Cleophas or Alphaeus would be the mother of Jude, the brother of Jesus that Papias identifies with Thaddeus:

The bishop of Salamis, Epiphanius, wrote in his work The Panarion (AD 374–375) that Joseph became the father of James and his three brothers (Joses, Simeon, Judah) and two sisters (a Salome and a Mary) or (a Salome and an Anna) with James being the elder sibling. James and his siblings were not children of Mary but were Joseph's children from a previous marriage. After Joseph's first wife died, many years later when he was eighty, "he took Mary (mother of Jesus)".

Alternative attribution
Both "Judas" and "Jude" are English translations of the  Greek name , which was a very common name in the 1st century. Over the years the identity of Jude has been questioned, and confusion remains among biblical scholars. It is not clear if Jude, the brother of Jesus, is also Jude, the brother of James, or Jude the Apostle, son of Mary mother of James the less and Jude.

There is an Apostle Jude in some lists of the Twelve, but not in others. He is called Jude of James. The name "Jude of James", as given in Luke 6:16, is sometimes interpreted as "Jude, brother of James", though such a construction commonly denotes a relationship of father and son. Other lists of the twelve include Thaddaeus, which may be nickname for the same apostle. His nickname may have occurred due to a resemblance to Jesus or to avoid confusion between Jude and Judas Iscariot. A local tradition of eastern Syria identifies the Apostle Jude with the Apostle Thomas, also known as Jude Thomas or Judas Didymus Thomas, as he is known in the Acts of Thomas and Gospel of Thomas (Thomas means 'twin' in Aramaic, as does Didymus in Greek.)

Descendants
Hegesippus, a 2nd-century Christian writer, mentions descendants of Jude living in the reign of Domitian (81-96). Eusebius relates in his Historia Ecclesiae (Book III, ch. 19–20):

Eusebius also relates (in Book III, ch. 32,5f.), that they suffered martyrdom under the Emperor Trajan.

Epiphanius of Salamis, in his Panarion, mentions a Judah Kyriakos, great grandson of Jude, as last Jewish Bishop of Jerusalem, who was still living after the Bar Kokhba's revolt.

References

External links
Catholic Encyclopedia: The Brethren of the Lord

 
1st-century writers
Brothers of Jesus
Followers of Jesus
People from Nazareth
People in the catholic epistles
Epistle of Jude
Gospel of Matthew
Gospel of Mark